The Chess Master, is a 1984 novel by Chinese writer Ah Cheng, writing under his pseudonym A Cheng. This short novel features characters who were part of the Down to the Countryside Movement after the Cultural Revolution. Written from the point of view of an unnamed narrator, readers learn more and more about the titular character, the chess master Wang Yisheng, and what drives him to play Chinese chess.

Plot
The story takes place in China during the Down to the Countryside Movement of the late 1960s and early 1970s. The unnamed narrator and the chess master Wang Yisheng are two young intellectuals among many who are sent to a remote farm in the mountains to work. During the train ride to the mountains, Wang Yisheng and his friend talk about how he learned to play Chinese chess, and how he evolved his current strategy. Wang Yisheng tells his friend that his family was very poor, and his mother did not want him to be such a chess maniac, since chess could not earn money. However, Wang Yisheng was very devoted to chess. One day, while gathering garbage to sell, Wang Yisheng meets an old man who is a chess master. Using the principles of Daoism, the old man teaches Wang everything he knows about chess. Wang Yisheng also tells his friend about how his mother always disapproved of his chess habit, but before she died, she painstakingly made him a chess set out of discarded toothbrush handles, because she knew how much he loved chess. The two friends then debark the train and head their separate ways to different farms in the countryside.

A couple months later, Wang Yisheng takes a vacation and visits his friend in the mountains. One of the narrator's friends at the farm, Legballs, happens to be a good chess player. Legballs is very impressed with Wang's ability, and the two become good friends.

After a while of working at the farm, there is a local festival with a chess tournament. The narrator, Legballs, and their friends all take a vacation to attend the festival. Wang Yisheng arrives too late to enter the official chess tournament, but he challenges the winners to an unofficial match after the tournament is over. Word spreads of his challenge, and many people decide to challenge him. He ends up playing 9 people at once without any chess boards in front of him (effectively playing blind), and he beats most of them easily. The final match ends in a draw, with Wang Yisheng having played against an old man who is too fragile to leave the house, and had to send his chess moves via messenger. Wang Yisheng bursts into tears after the match, lamenting for his dead mother. The old man leaves his house to praise him personally.

English translation

Adaptation
Chess King, a 1988 Chinese film
King of Chess (1991 film), a 1991 Hong Kong film

20th-century Chinese novels
1984 novels
Novels set in China
Chess books
Chinese novels adapted into films
Works by Ah Cheng